Caxton may refer to:

Places
 Caxton Street, Brisbane, Australia
 Caxton, Cambridgeshire, a village in Cambridgeshire, UK
 Caxton Gibbet, a knoll near the village
 Caxton Hall, a historic building in London, UK
 Caxton Building, a historic building in Cleveland, Ohio, US
 Saint-Élie-de-Caxton, Quebec, Canada

Publishers  
 Caxton Press (New Zealand)
 Caxton and CTP Publishers and Printers, a publisher in South Africa
 Caxton Press (United Kingdom)
 Caxton Press (United States)

Other uses
 Caxton Associates, an American investment firm
 Caxton Club, an American social club in Chicago, Illinois, US
 Caxton College, a private school in Valencia, Spain
 The Caxtons, a novel by Edward Bulwer-Lytton
 William Henry Rhodes or Caxton, American attorney
 William Caxton, an English printer, credited as being the first person to introduce the printing press to England in the 1470s

See also
Caxton Press (disambiguation)